AeroMax may refer to:
Ford AeroMax, an American truck design
Morgan Aeromax, a British car design
Team Mini-Max AeroMax, an American ultralight aircraft design